Thomas Thompson (1879–1939) was an English professional footballer who played in the Football League for Small Heath.

Thompson was born in Smethwick, Staffordshire. He was playing for Nettlefolds' works team when Small Heath signed him, attracted by his pace on the left wing. His debut, on 24 January 1903 in a Second Division game away at Preston North End which Small Heath lost 2–1, was his only first-team appearance, and he returned that same year to non-league football with Oldbury Town.

He died in Birmingham in 1939.

References

1879 births
1939 deaths
Sportspeople from Smethwick
English footballers
Association football wingers
Birmingham City F.C. players
Oldbury Town F.C. players
English Football League players
Date of birth missing
Date of death missing